The RN-94 (6 × 6) armoured personnel carrier was originally developed by Nurol Machinery and Industry Co Inc (Nurol Makina) based in Ankara and S N Romarm SA Filiala S C Moreni of Bucharest, Romania.
The hull of the RN-94 is all-welded steel armour structure which provides maximum protection against 7.62 mm armour-piercing ammunition and shell splinters all round.

Operators
 - Bangladesh Army operates the armoured ambulance variant in limited number. Estimated 9.
  - prototype
  - 5

Notes

Wheeled armoured personnel carriers
Armoured personnel carriers of Romania
Six-wheeled vehicles
Military vehicles introduced in the 1990s
Eight-wheeled vehicles
Wheeled amphibious armoured fighting vehicles
Armoured personnel carriers of the post–Cold War period